William Henry and Sarah Holderness House, also known as the Holderness-Paschal-Page House, is a historic plantation house located near Yanceyville, Caswell County, North Carolina. It was built about 1855, and is a two-story, Greek Revival style frame dwelling.  It consists of a three-bay, hip roofed, main block flanked by one-story, one-bay side wings.  The front facade features a pedimented one-bay Greek Revival-style porch, also found on the wing entrances. The interior features architectural woodwork by Thomas Day. Also on the property are the contributing smokehouse (c. 1855) and carriage house (c. 1855).

It was listed on the National Register of Historic Places in 2014.

References 

Plantation houses in North Carolina
Houses on the National Register of Historic Places in North Carolina
Greek Revival houses in North Carolina
Houses completed in 1855
Houses in Caswell County, North Carolina
National Register of Historic Places in Caswell County, North Carolina